Coalition for Progress (Catalan: Coalició pel Progrés) was a progressive electoral alliance formed in Andorra.
The alliance was a merger of the Democratic National Initiative, National Democratic Group and New Democracy (Andorra).

History
In 1999, three progressive parties from the opposition formed an electoral alliance for the 1999 local elections. This coalition presented lists in Andorra la Vella and Escaldes-Engordany. In the elections, it obtained 2,416 votes and 13 councillors, and won in Andorra la Vella.

The media consider their successor to be the Social Democratic Party.

References

Defunct political parties in Andorra
Political parties established in 1999
1999 establishments in Andorra